Jamie P. Chandler (born 1977) is an American political scientist, television commentator, and writer. He is an expert on American elections, public opinion, Congress, and US foreign policy. He teaches at the Colin Powell School for Civic and Global Leadership at CUNY City College.

Journalism and Commentary
Chandler is a frequent on-air guest commentator for CBS News Up to the Minute, WCBS-TV, WABC-TV, NBC New York NY Nightly News with Chuck Scarborough, and WPIX Morning News. He also provides commentary on CNN Radio, NPR, and KID (AM) News Radio. During 2011, he hosted a political talk show "Center Forward with Jamie Chandler" on LA Talk Radio.

Chandler's political commentary has been published by the Associated Press, Atlanta Journal-Constitution, Bloomberg, Boston Globe, Chicago Tribune, CNN, Daily Mail, Daily News (New York), Financial Times, Houston Chronicle, Huffington Post, International Business Times, NBC News, Newsday, The New York Times, Reuters, San Francisco Chronicle, Talking Points Memo, The Daily Beast, The Palm Beach Post, The Washington Post, Washington Times, Washington Examiner, USA Today, and Yahoo News.

He has written columns for U.S. News & World Report, Politico, and International Business Times. During the 2012 Election season, he blogged for the Daily News (New York). In February 2013 he began writing for Thomas Jefferson Street, U.S. News & World Reports political opinion blog.

Research
Chandler has published several papers on forecasting elections, political history, and survey research. Between 2007 and 2009 he was a visiting fellow at the Applied Statistics Center at Columbia University studying under Statistician Andrew Gelman.

Bibliography
 The Playing Field Shifts: Predicting the Seats-Votes Curve in the 2008 U.S. House Elections," with Andrew Gelman and Jonathan Kastellec. 2008. PS:Political Science and Politics. 1(4): 729-32.
 Predicting and Dissecting the Seats-Votes Curve in the 2006 U.S. House Election," with Andrew Gelman and Jonathan Kastellec. 2008. PS: Political Science & Politics. 41(1): 139-145.

Education 
After studying at Plymouth North High School he graduated with honors from Harvard University, and pursued doctoral studies in political science at City University of New York Graduate School and University Center.

Political views and Influence
Chandler is a centrist, non partisan political analyst. He is a strong advocate for reasoned government and responsive politics, and gives much attention to income inequality, civil and minority rights. In 2013, he and journalist Palmer Gibbs published a column in the New York Times on the ethics of the major credit card companies doing business with hates groups. The piece went on to influence MasterCard to drop several anti-Semitic, Holocaust denial organizations from its payment processing network.

Entertainment and Documentaries
Chandler has made a number of factual television appearances and produced a short documentary in 2011 The Faces of Occupy Wall Street. In February 2012 he appeared in USA Networks "Characters Unite" campaign. He also appeared on mtvU's Professors Strike Back in September 2012 in the episode "Professor is 'Hot for his Age'."

References

External links
 Official website
 Politico: The Arena
 U.S. News & World Report: Debate Club
 International Business Times

American male journalists
Living people
1977 births
Harvard University alumni
City University of New York alumni